Ensonido is a real-time post processing algorithm that allows users to play back MP3 Surround files in standard headphones.
Ensonido was developed by the Fraunhofer Society. It simulates the natural reception of surround sound by the human ear, which usually receives tones from surrounding loudspeakers and from reflections and echoes of the listening room. The out-of-head localization achieved that way increases the listening comfort noticeably in contrast to conventional stereo headphone listening with its in-head localization of all sounds. In version 3.0 of the Fraunhofer IIS MP3 Surround Player, Ensonido is replaced with newer mp3HD

External links
all4mp3.com Software, demos, information, and various mp3 resources
mp3surround.com - Demo content, information and evaluation software
The Register news story
Press Releases
 mp3surrounded.com - First Blog in the internet about MP3 Surround-MP3 Surround Samples

Audio codecs
Digital audio